Daouda Ly (born 21 October 1972) is a retired Senegalese football goalkeeper.

Sylla was capped for Senegal and was a squad member for the 2000 African Cup of Nations. He played club football for ASC Ndiambour, SONACOS and ASC Diaraf.

References

1972 births
Living people
Senegalese footballers
ASC Jaraaf players
Senegal international footballers
2000 African Cup of Nations players
Association football goalkeepers